Yacht support vessels, also known as a shadow yacht or shadow vessel, are specialized ships which provide support and auxiliary functions for large sailing and motor yachts.

Design features  

Support yachts are generally primarily intended to carry the "toys" of the super rich, whether they be a rigid inflatable boat, a fishing boat, luxury yacht tender, jet-ski or submersible.

A helipad is a common feature, especially when supporting sailing yachts which do not have their own landing pad.

Market 
Incat Crowther and the Damen Group are major builders of yacht support vessels. Florida based Shadow Marine converts offshore supply vessels into yacht support vessels.

See also 
 List of yacht support vessels by length

References 

Ship types